The 1994 Colorado Buffaloes football team represented the University of Colorado at Boulder in the 1994 college football season. The Buffaloes offense scored 439 points while the defense allowed 235 points.  The team was led by head coach Bill McCartney.

The Buffaloes' only loss of the season came on the road against eventual consensus national champion Nebraska. Colorado, ranked #2 at the time, was in line to play for the national title as part of the Bowl Coalition. They were leapfrogged in the polls by the Cornhuskers, who had been ranked #3, and finished the regular season ranked #4.

The Buffaloes competed in the 1995 Fiesta Bowl, which they won 41–24 over unranked Notre Dame.

The problem of scheduling bowl match-ups for top-ranked teams led to the dissolution of the Bowl Coalition and the creation of the Bowl Alliance (#2 ranked Penn State was not eligible as a member of the Big Ten Conference to play the #1 ranked team).  Notre Dame, playing as an independent, had its own agreement with the Bowl Coalition, which allowed the Fiesta Bowl to choose them as an at-large opponent over more highly ranked teams.

Schedule

Roster

Rankings

Season summary

Northeast Louisiana

Rashan Salaam 24 Rush, 184 Yds

Wisconsin

Michigan

The Miracle at Michigan refers to the final play that occurred during the game played on September 24, 1994, between the Colorado Buffaloes and the Michigan Wolverines at Michigan Stadium in Ann Arbor, Michigan. The game was decided on Colorado quarterback Kordell Stewart's 64-yard Hail Mary pass to Michael Westbrook, which gave the play its name.

Texas

Missouri

Oklahoma

Kansas State

Nebraska

Oklahoma State

Kansas

Iowa State

Fiesta Bowl

Players drafted in the 1995 NFL Draft

Awards and honors
Chris Hudson, Jim Thorpe Award
Rashaan Salaam, Doak Walker Award
Rashaan Salaam, Heisman Trophy
Rashaan Salaam, Walter Camp Award

References

Colorado
Colorado Buffaloes football seasons
Fiesta Bowl champion seasons
Colorado Buffaloes football